The President pro tempore of the Senate of the Philippines is the second highest-ranking official of the Senate of the Philippines. During the absence of the Senate President, the Senate President pro tempore presides over the Senate.

In the current 19th Congress, the incumbent President pro tempore of the Senate of the Philippines is Loren Legarda.

List of Senate presidents pro tempore

References
List of Senators of the Philippines

External links
Senate of the Philippines

 
Legislative speakers in the Philippines
Political office-holders in the Philippines
Philippines